Prodasineura, the Asian threadtails, is a genus of damselflies in the family Protoneuridae. All the Afrotropical species formerly in this genus are now placed in Elattoneura, the African threadtails. Dijkstra  et al. (2014) moved the genus (and related Elattoneura) from Protoneuridae to Platycnemididae based on molecular phylogenetic research.

Description
These  are  delicately built damselflies, with very wide heads. The males have starkly contrasting colours, typically a black body that is striped in blue, red or yellow. The colour pattern on the male's synthorax (which carries the wings) and tip of his abdomen, in combination with the shape of the four terminal appendages (the cerci and paraprocts, or male claspers for copulation) are useful features when distinguishing species in the genus. The cerci are generally hammer-like with a pointed apex, while the broad  paraprocts taper abruptly towards a rounded tip. While females are broadly similar to males, details of their well-developed prothorax facilitate separation of species.

Habitats
Some are found along fast-flowing streams, while others conversely prefer streams flowing slowly over sandy substrates. Some occur at open streams in secondary forest or the tributaries of lowland rivers.

Species
It contains the following species:

References 

Protoneuridae
Taxonomy articles created by Polbot